Oocephala agrianthoides is a plant in the family Asteraceae, native to Central Africa.

Description
The capitula feature red, lilac or purple flowers. The fruits are achenes.

Distribution and habitat
Oocephala agrianthoides is native to Burundi and Tanzania.

Conservation
Oocephala agrianthoides has been assessed as endangered on the IUCN Red List. The species is threatened by agriculture, tree plantations and cattle overgrazing.

References

agrianthoides
Flora of Burundi
Flora of Tanzania
Plants described in 1988
Taxobox binomials not recognized by IUCN